The 2009 National League speedway season was the third tier/division of British speedway and was contested by ten teams. Bournemouth Buccaneers were champions. It was the first season under the new name after previously been known as the Conference League.

Final table
PL = Matches; W = Wins; D = Draws; L = Losses; BP = Bonus Pts Pts = Total Points

SCORING SYSTEM
Home loss by any number of points = 0
Home draw = 1
Home win by between 1 and 6 points = 2
Home win by 7 points or more = 3
Away loss by 7 points or more = 0
Away loss by 6 points or less = 1
Away draw = 2
Away win by between 1 and 6 points = 3
Away win by 7 points or more = 4

Play Offs
Top four teams race off in two-legged semi-finals and final to decide championship.
The winner was Bournemouth Buccaneers who defeated the Plymouth Devils in the final.

Semi-finals

Final

Final Leading averages

National League Knockout Cup
The 2009 National League Knockout Cup was the 12th edition of the Knockout Cup for tier three teams but the first under its new name. Bournemouth Buccaneers were the winners.

First round

Quarter-finals

Semi-finals

Final

Teams and final averages

Bournemouth
Jay Herne 9.03 
Danny Warwick 8.18 
Andrew Aldridge 6.42 
Mark Baseby 6.08 
Kyle Newman 5.21 
Aaron Baseby 4.95 
Jerran Hart 4.83 
John Resch	3.0 

Buxton
Craig Cook 9.28 
Ben Taylor	7.86 
Jade Mudgway 7.42 
Scott James 6.06 
Scott Richardson 5.66 
Gareth Isherwood 5.33 
Lewis Dallaway	4.86 
Danny Hodgson 3.00 

Isle Of Wight
Nick Simmons 9.95
Matthew Wright 6.91
Ben Hopwood 6.88
Chris Johnson 6.46
Dean Felton 4.42
Danny Berwick 3.68
Tom Hill 3.00
Rikki Mullins 3.00

King's Lynn
Jamie Smith 10.34 
Adam Allott 9.86 
Darren Mallett 8.80 
Scott Campos 5.33 
Adam Lowe	3.58 
Rhys Naylor 3.50 
Jake Knight 3.00 
Chris Widman 3.00 

Mildenhall
Barrie Evans 8.81 
James Birkinshaw 8.42 
Luke Priest 7.39 
Oliver Rayson 4.59	 
Joe Jacobs 3.72 
Taylor Poole 3.00 
Adam Kirby	3.00 
Nick Laurence 3.00 

Newport
Tony Atkin	8.58
Grant Tregoning 6.75
Karl Mason	6.73
Shelby Rutherford 4.64
Ryan Sedgmen 4.26
Sam Hurst 4.24
Marc Owen 3.00
Tom Young 3.00

Plymouth
Mark Simmons 9.70
Seemond Stephens 8.45
Kyle Hughes 8.42
Matt Bates	7.00
Paul Starke 6.03
David Gough 3.07
Danny Stoneman 3.00
Josh Dingle 3.00

Rye House
Danny Halsey 6.87 
David Mason 6.45 
Rob Smith 6.22 
Jamie Courtney 6.09 
Lee Strudwick 5.30 
Daniel Blake 4.54 
Ben Morley 4.00 
Michael Bovis 3.00 

Scunthorpe
Simon Lambert 10.54
Gary Irving 5.55
Richard Franklin 4.97
James Sarjeant 4.00
Kyle Howarth 3.45
Adam Wrathall 3.33
John MacPhail 3.00
Ashley Morris 3.00

Weymouth
James Cockle 8.70								
Benji Compton 7.73								
Mark Burrows 7.55								
Lee Smethills 6.46								
Terry Day 6.05								
Tim Webster 6.00								
James White-Williams 5.40								
Alex McLeod 3.00

See also
 List of United Kingdom Speedway League Champions

References

Speedway National League
Speedway National League
Speedway National League